Harrison Township is one of fourteen townships in Cass County, Indiana. As of the 2010 census, its population was 802.

History
Harrison Township was organized in 1836. It was named for William Henry Harrison, who had served as Governor of the Indiana Territory, congressman, senator, and who would afterward serve as the ninth President of the United States.

Geography

Unincorporated towns
 Leases Corner
 Lucerne

Adjacent townships
 Wayne Township, Fulton County (north)
 Bethlehem (east)
 Clay (southeast)
 Noble (south)
 Jefferson (southwest)
 Boone (west)
 Van Buren Township, Pulaski County (northwest)

Major highways
  U.S. Route 35
  Indiana State Road 16
  Indiana State Road 17

Cemeteries
The township contains four cemeteries: Crooked Creek, Grant, Old Indian Creek and Saint Elizabeth.

References
 
 United States Census Bureau cartographic boundary files

External links

 Indiana Township Association
 United Township Association of Indiana

Townships in Cass County, Indiana
Townships in Indiana
1836 establishments in Indiana
Populated places established in 1836